Pleckstrin homology domain containing A4 is a protein that in humans is encoded by the PLEKHA4 gene.

Function

This gene encodes a pleckstrin homology (PH) domain-containing protein. The PH domain is found near the N-terminus and contains a putative phosphatidylinositol 3, 4, 5-triphosphate-binding motif (PPBM). Elevated expression of this gene has been observed in some melanomas. Alternate splicing results in multiple transcript variants encoding different isoforms.

References

Further reading